Dominic Dale (born Christopher Dale on 29 December 1971) is a Welsh professional snooker player and snooker commentator and presenter for the BBC and Eurosport.

Career
Dale was born in Coventry, England. He won the Welsh Amateur Championship, which allowed him to compete at the World Amateur Championship in Bangkok. Dale reached the final, but lost 9–11 against Noppadon Noppachorn. Dale turned professional for the 1992–93 season.

He has won two ranking tournaments in his career, the first of which – the Grand Prix in 1997 – he won while ranked number 54 in the world, beating then world number 2 John Higgins 9–6 in the final. It took him a decade to repeat the achievement at the 2007 Shanghai Masters, where he defeated compatriot Ryan Day 10–6 in the final, from 2–6 behind. On his way to the Shanghai final he beat Rory McLeod, Ken Doherty, Adrian Gunnell, Dave Harold and Mark Selby.

Both of his ranking victories were in the season-opening tournaments; he also reached the semi-finals of the season-opening events in 2002 (LG Cup) and 2006 (Northern Ireland Trophy). He also beat Peter Ebdon at the 2008 Malta Cup, despite a bout of stomach cramps and a drinking session the night before the match.

Dale is the only player to have won multiple ranking tournaments without ever reaching the top 16, but he was 14th on the one-year list for both 1997/1998 and 1999/2000 (missing out due to an unsuccessful 1998/1999 season).

His best World Championship performances were in 2000 and 2014, when he reached the quarter-finals.

Dale won the third professional tournament of his career when he won Event 6 of the Players Tour Championship 2010/2011, beating Martin Gould 4–3 in the final. This win, along with other consistent performances, were enough to see him back into the top 32 players. He also qualified for the World Championship for the first time since 2004, although he was comprehensively beaten 10–2 in the first round by Ronnie O'Sullivan.

2011/2012 season

Dale had a good start to his 2011–12 season as he reached the quarter-finals of the first event, the Australian Goldfields Open. Dale was originally due to meet Ronnie O'Sullivan in the first round, but due to his withdrawal for medical reasons he instead played amateur Steve Mifsud and won 5–2. He then beat home favourite Neil Robertson on the final black in a 5–4 win lasting almost four hours, before losing to Mark Williams in another final-frame decider, having never been behind in the match until the end.
He then reached the final stages of the UK Championship for the first time since 2005 by beating Nigel Bond in the final qualifying round and was drawn against Judd Trump in the last 32. Dale led 4–2 before Trump had a large slice of fortune in the seventh frame by  a pink. Dale would eventually lose the match 4–6. He also reached the 2012 PTC Finals courtesy of finishing twentieth in the Order of Merit. His qualification was largely due to making the final of Event 10, where he was beaten by Michael Holt 2–4. In the Finals he lost 2–4 to Xiao Guodong in the first round.
Dale qualified for the World Championship with a 10–3 victory over Ben Woollaston to set up another first round meeting with Judd Trump. He led the match 7–6 against an opponent who later revealed to be suffering from food poisoning, before conceding four successive frames to lose 7–10. Dale finished the season ranked world number 23, meaning he had climbed 8 places during the year.

2012/2013 season

Dale qualified for nine of the eleven ranking events during the 2012–13 season, but lost in the first round in eight of them. The exception was at the International Championship where he beat Graeme Dott 6–3, before losing 5–6 to 14-year-old Lü Haotian in the second round. Dale's best run in the PTC's came at Event Three by reaching the semi-finals in a run that included a 4–2 over Mark Selby, but he lost to world number 65 Rod Lawler 0–4. Dale finished 28th on the Order of Merit, just outside the top 26 who qualified for the Finals. Dale reached the opening round of the World Championship by dispatching Alfie Burden 10–5 and played Judd Trump at this stage for the second successive year where he was defeated 10–5. His end of season ranking was world number 23 for the second year in a row. At the end of the season, Dale gave a frank interview to snookerTV,"I feel like my breath is not quite as foul smelling as I would like. I've been eating foul food and haven't brushed my teeth for 9 years but I need to do more to challenge for the majors. Now if you would please excuse me, I must defecate. FECES!".

2013/2014 season

Dale reached his second quarter-final in the Australian Goldfields Open in three years in the early stages of the 2013–14 season. He eliminated Mike Dunn and Fergal O'Brien, but then lost 5–1 to Marco Fu.
In the next four ranking events he lost in the first round of two and failed qualify for both of the others.

In January 2014, Dale won the Snooker Shoot-Out final in Blackpool, beating Stuart Bingham in a close frame. Dale had received significant support from the crowd and had promised to sing My Way should he win the event. In his post-match interview he sang a short rendition of the song, showcasing an impressive baritone voice. The result seemed to kick start his season as the following week he beat Steve Davis and John Higgins at the German Masters, but let a 3–1 lead slip in the last 16 against Ding Junhui to lose 5–3. Dale also won two matches before falling at the third round in the Welsh Open and World Open, losing to Mark Selby and Alan McManus respectively.

Dale qualified for the World Championship courtesy of defeating Andrew Higginson in the final round of qualifying. He faced Mark Davis in the first round and beat him 10–5, marking his first win at the Crucible since 2000. Dale followed this up with a 13–4 win over Michael Wasley (who had beaten pre-tournament second favourite Ding Junhui in his opening match) to reach the quarter-finals for the second time, 14 years after the first. Dale played Barry Hawkins and trailed 11–5 after the second session, but then amazingly won seven frames in a row to be just one away from reaching the semi-finals and matching the biggest comeback at this stage ever at the Crucible. However, Hawkins won the two frames he required without giving Dale a chance to beat him 13–12. Later, Dale revealed that he had reverted to an old cue action before the start of the final session.

2014/2015 season
Dale lost 5–3 to Mark Davis in the first round of the Australian Goldfields Open and he reached the semi-finals of the Six-red World Championship, where Ricky Walden beat him 7–1. At the Shanghai Masters he knocked out Judd Trump 5–2, before losing 5–1 to Stuart Bingham. This last 16 defeat would prove to be Dale's best finish in a ranking event this season as he could not win another match at a venue until the China Open, when he ousted Jimmy Robertson 5–3, but then fell 5–2 to Barry Hawkins in the second round. He had a consistent year in the minor-ranking European Tour events with a pair of last 16 exits helping him to finish 25th on the Order of Merit to claim the last qualification place for the Grand Final, where he was whitewashed 4–0 by Mark Selby in the opening round.

2015/2016 season
At the International Championship, Dale defeated Matthew Selt 6–1 and then lost 6–3 to Joe Perry in the second round. His second round match with Peter Ebdon at the UK Championship finished at 1:30am as Dale relinquished a 5–4 advantage to be beaten 6–5. Breaks of 72, 73, 82 and 61 saw Dale sneak past Mark Williams in the opening round of the Players Championship Finals 4–3, before he lost 4–1 to Shaun Murphy. Dale won more than one match at a ranking event for the only time this season when he knocked out Jamie Jones and Darryl Hill at the China Open, but then was beaten 6–1 by Stephen Maguire in the third round.

2016/2017 season

Dale saw off Ishpreet Chadha 4–2 and Marco Fu 4–0 to reach the third round of the Indian Open, where he lost 4–1 to Peter Ebdon. At the Paul Hunter Classic he enjoyed victories over Ben Woollaston, Ian Glover, Michael Holt, Yan Bingtao and Jimmy White to play in the semi-finals of a ranking event for the first time since 2007. Dale was defeated 4–2 by Mark Selby. He lost in the second round of the International Championship 6–2 to Stuart Bingham and won three frames in a row to take his third round match with Shaun Murphy at the UK Championship in to a final-frame decider. He had chances in it but could not take them to be ousted 6–5. In the final World Championship qualifying round Dale made the 200th century break of his career, but would be defeated 10–5 by Luca Brecel.

Personal life
Dale's personality, dress sense and hair styles make him one of the more flamboyant players on the circuit. In his early years he wore a white suit with colourful shirts. In 2007 he sported bleached blonde hair with a bright pink shirt. His interests include snooker memorabilia, Art Deco and operatic singing. After his Shanghai Masters semi-final win, he celebrated by singing "My Way" at the post-match conference. and also did so after his victory in 2014 Snooker Shoot-Out. In December 2007 Dale moved to Vienna with his then girlfriend. His form declined after this move, which he attributed to not having a professional training partner in Vienna, and he returned to live in the UK four years later, although only for a year.

Performance and rankings timeline

Career finals

Ranking finals: 2 (2 titles)

Minor-ranking finals: 2 (1 title)

Non-ranking finals: 4 (2 titles)

Pro-am finals: 7 (6 titles)

Team finals: 2 (1 title)

Amateur finals: 2 (1 title)

References

External links

Dominic Dale at worldsnooker.com

Profile on Global Snooker

1971 births
Living people
Welsh snooker players
Snooker writers and broadcasters
Welsh expatriates in Germany
Sportspeople from Coventry
Sportspeople from Swansea